George Christopher (born George Wilson, 5 March 1970) is a British actor.

He is best known for his teenage role as Liverpudlian scamp Ziggy Greaves in Grange Hill, a role he played from 1986 to 1989. The character was a hit with viewers, and Wilson himself has compared his alter-ego with the series' original hero, Tucker Jenkins. Following his acting career he took up a business that embraced his stage name and his desire to upcycle the front of customers' houses whilst staying true to his musical icon, David Bowie. And hence 'Ziggy Paves Your Drives' was born.

After Grange Hill, Wilson took on another high-profile role in the Channel 4 soap Brookside, as Little Jimmy Corkhill. He played the drug addict son of Jimmy Corkhill senior.

George has since taken on a variety of stage and film roles, including a play about the Hillsborough disaster.

He lives in Liverpool with his young son.

References

External links
 George Christopher interview at Grange Hill Gold

1970 births
Living people
English male actors
Male actors from Liverpool
English male soap opera actors